The 2018–19 Elitedivisionen is the 47th season of the highest women's football league in Denmark and is currently contested by 8 teams each year in Denmark. Fortuna Hjørring are the defending champions.

Main round
Teams play each other twice. Top six advance to the championship round.

Championship round
Teams play ten more matches. Points are reset, but bonus points are awarded for the placement in the main round. 10 points for first place, 8 points for second place and then 6, 4, 2 and 0.

Top scorers

Source: Betxpert.com

References

External links
 Official website 
  on soccerway.com

2018-19
2018–19 domestic women's association football leagues
Women
1